The Sam Snead Festival was an unofficial money golf tournament, played from 1948 to 1961, at The Greenbrier in White Sulphur Springs, West Virginia. It attracted many PGA Tour players and was won by longtime Greenbrier club pro Sam Snead six times.

The tournament began as the Greenbrier Pro-Am in 1948, and was a 36-hole pro-amateur event with 18 invited top professionals of the day. Prizes were awarded for both the professional medal total and the pro-am best ball total.  The event went to four rounds the next year; the first 36 holes with just the professionals, the amateurs joining in for the final 36 holes.

Winners
Sam Snead Festival
1961 Sam Snead
1960 Dave Marr
1959 Sam Snead

Greenbrier Invitational
1958 Sam Snead
1957 Dutch Harrison

Greenbrier Pro-Am
1956 Ed Oliver
1955 Dutch Harrison
1954 Herman Scharlau
1953 Sam Snead
1952 Sam Snead
1951 Sam Snead
1950 Ben Hogan
1949 Cary Middlecoff
1948 Henry Cotton

See also
Greenbrier Classic, PGA Tour event starting in 2010
The Greenbrier American Express Championship, Senior PGA Tour event from 1985–87
White Sulphur Springs Open, a PGA Tour event, held irregularly in the 1920s and 1930s

References

Golf in West Virginia
The Greenbrier
Greenbrier
Unofficial money golf tournaments